Flower of Forgetfulness may refer to one of the following

Poppy
Daylily 
Hemerocallis fulva
A museum porcelain piece featured in Robert A. Heinlein's story, "—We Also Walk Dogs"